Renán López (born 31 October 1939) is a Bolivian footballer. He played in seven matches for the Bolivia national football team from 1963 to 1967. He was also part of Bolivia's squad that won the 1963 South American Championship.

References

1939 births
Living people
Bolivian footballers
Bolivia international footballers
Place of birth missing (living people)
Association football midfielders
C.D. Jorge Wilstermann players